James Christopher MacRae (March 28, 1878 – February 1, 1957) was a college football player and coach as well as an attorney. He was once mayor of Chapel Hill, North Carolina.

Early years
He was born on March 28, 1878 in Fayetteville, North Carolina to James Cameron MacRae, once justice of the state Supreme Court and dean of the University of North Carolina.

University of North Carolina
MacRae was a prominent running back for the North Carolina Tar Heels football team of the University of North Carolina. Dr. Joel Whitaker praised his defense.

1898
He was selected All-Southern in 1898. The team was undefeated Southern champion.

Coaching career
He was an assistant at his alma mater.

References

North Carolina Tar Heels football players
All-Southern college football players
American football halfbacks
19th-century players of American football
Sportspeople from Fayetteville, North Carolina
1878 births
1957 deaths
North Carolina Tar Heels football coaches